Mukakamanzi Beatha (born in Gasabo District) is a Rwandan actress. One of the most popular actresses in Rwanda, Beatha is best known in Giramata film as 'Giramata's mother' and in City maid as Nick's mother.

Personal life
Beatha Mukakamanzi was born in Gatsibo District.

She married in 1983 and is a mother of 6 children and 4 grand children. Her children are Intore Masamba, Jules Sentore and Cecile Kayirebwa are most popular singers in Rwandan culture.

Career
Her maiden film acting came through the film The Deadly Spear. After the film, she acted in several popular films such as Rwasibo, Intare y’Ingore, Giramata n’izindi, It's Not the End, Dreams, Enemy of Love, Conclusion, and Make Milk. Then she joined with the popular television series City Maid.

she is known as Madalina in film called Inzozi series, directed by Muniru Habiyakare and  Felix kamanzi, it is produced by Ndayirukiye Fleury and Rugwizangoga Tharcisse, this film is written for supporting marriage because in our days marriage is neither stronger than ever it's for the contribution of many people found in Rwandan cinema and journalist.

Partial filmography

References

External links
 

Rwandan actresses
Living people
People from Kigali
1983 births